Atlas of the Prehistoric World  is a book written by Douglas Palmer. It was published in 1999 by Random House, Inc. It covers the last 620 million years.

References

1999 non-fiction books
Paleontology books
Encyclopedias of science
1999 in paleontology